The 1925 Victorian Football Association season was the 47th season of the Australian rules football competition. The premiership was won by the Brunswick Football Club, after it defeated Port Melbourne by 16 points in the final on 31 August. It was the club's second VFA premiership.

Association membership 

During the 1924/25 offseason, the Victorian Football League looked towards the expansion of its numbers, as well as securing the new and strategically valuable Motordrome as a regular venue. While several Association clubs were keen to be admitted to the League, the 1923 agreement between the two bodies regarding player transfers effectively prevented any clubs from changing competition.

The Association received applications from Camberwell, Coburg, Yarraville, and Public Service for admission in 1925. In December 1924, it decided to admit Coburg and to provisionally admit Public Service if it could secure a suitable playing ground, which it ultimately could not. The Association considered a legal challenge, but decided against it. The League also obtained the permission of the Minister for Lands to admit  and allow it to use the North Melbourne Recreation Reserve, reversing a decision the Minister had made in 1921 that the venue should be reserved for Association use.

The changes left the Association without three of its strongest clubs: on-field,  and  had between them won every minor premiership since 1912, and won fifteen of the twenty-six premierships since the breakaway of the League in 1897; off-field, the clubs were amongst the richest. The League stated on the record that it wanted to poach three strong clubs, rather than just one, to weaken the Association as much as possible, as it was concerned that with 'the agreement' broken, a strong Association would be in the position to recruit heavily from League clubs – as had occurred in the early 1920s before 'the agreement' was in place. Many Association delegates believed that Footscray's victory against League premiers  in the previous year's end-of-season playoff charity match had contributed significantly to the League's fears and motivated its actions.

Melbourne Carnivals Ltd, which owned the Motordrome, was keen to stage top level football on its venue. At one stage, it considered an ambitious scheme to install floodlights and stage night matches at the Motordrome, to establish three new clubs into the Association – Public Service, Melbourne City and Richmond City – as well as admitting Coburg and Camberwell, and to bankroll enormous wages of £5 per week to lure the best players away from the League, in an attempt to make the Association the dominant football competition in the state. Nothing ever came of the scheme; but, fifty years later, a very similar set of circumstances played out when World Series Cricket changed the landscape of world cricket.

The Association secured the Motordrome as its finals venue, having lost the North Melbourne Recreation Reserve in the League's expansion. As a result of the changes, the size of the Association was reduced to eight clubs.

Premiership 
The home-and-home season was played over only fourteen rounds, compared with the eighteen matches that previous seasons had been played over, with each club playing the others twice; then, the top four clubs contested a finals series under the amended Argus system to determine the premiers for the season.

Ladder

Finals

Notable events 
 Tommy Downs (Northcote) won the Woodham Cup as the best and fairest player in the Association. Downs polled five votes, finishing ahead of Elston (Geelong) who polled four votes; seven players tied for third.
 Leo McInerney (Brunswick) was the Association's leading goalscorer for the year, finishing with 75 goals in the home-and-home season, and 79 goals overall.

External links 
 List of VFA premiers

References 

Victorian Football League seasons
VFL